Buffalo Bull's Back Fat, or Stu-mick-o-súcks (in the Blackfoot language), was a head war chief of the Blood Indians. He is remembered today for his portrait, painted by George Catlin in 1832, located at the Smithsonian American Art Museum.

In one of his letters, Catlin wrote:

The painting appeared in the exhibit Pictures from the New World at Schloss Charlottenburg, which was held in the Orangerie of Charlottenburg Palace, Berlin, Germany, in 1989.

References 

Kainai Nation people
Masterpiece Museum
Native American leaders
19th-century Native Americans